"Only One Moon" is a single by Canadian country music group Prairie Oyster. Released in 1995, it was the fifth single from their album Only One Moon. The song reached #1 on the RPM Country Tracks chart in August 1995.

Chart performance

Year-end charts

References

1995 singles
Prairie Oyster songs
1994 songs
Arista Records singles
Songs written by Keith Glass